CCW is an album by Hugh Cornwell, formerly of the new wave group the Stranglers, with Roger Cook and Andy West (CCW: Cornwell, Cook, West). It was released in 1992 by UFO Records.

Background
Through his publishing company, Cornwell had been put together with English songwriter Roger Cook in the late 1980s to write songs. Cook was known for his songwriting collaboration with Roger Greenaway in the 1960s, penning songs such as "I'd Like to Teach the World to Sing" (The New Seekers) and "Something's Gotten Hold of My Heart" (Gene Pitney). Now living in Nashville in the US, Cook would periodically come to England to write with other songwriters. "Every few months he would come over and we would write a song," Cornwell said in 2006. "And then we had so many of these songs written that I suggested we do a record together. We brought in a third singer-songwriter called Andy West and so we became Cornwell, Cook and West."

The CCW album was recorded in December 1991 at Koh-san Studios in Bath with Cornwell producing. Neil Davidge, who would later work with Massive Attack, among others, co-produced 5 of the albums 10 tracks. With a 7-piece band, including session drummer Rob Brian, the trio promoted the album in 1992, playing shows in the UK and Europe.

"Sweet Sister" was released as a single from the album. Different formats included the non-album tracks "Let It Fall" and "Friend Wheel", penned by Andy West, and "I Believe", penned by Cook. The CD-single and 12" also included a 'FM Rock Club Mix' of "Sweet Sister" by remixer Simon Harris.

Track listing

Personnel
Credits adapted from the album liner notes.

CCW
Hugh Cornwell – vocals, electric and acoustic guitar
Roger Cook – vocals, electric and acoustic ukulele
Andy West – vocals, electric and acoustic guitar
Additional musicians
Herbie Flowers – electric and acoustic bass (1, 2, 4, 6, 7, 9)
Chris Goulstone – lead guitar (1, 10) 
Joel Squires – harmonica (3)
Rob Brian – snare drum (4), drum kit (6), tabla (8)
Stuart Gordon – violin (5, 6)
Technical
Hugh Cornwell – producer
Neil Davidge – co-producer (1, 2, 7, 9, 10)
Pete Parsons – engineer
Phil Smee – design, photography

References

External links
Hugh Cornwell : CCW Page

Hugh Cornwell albums
1992 albums
Albums produced by Neil Davidge